Zgornja Pristava is a settlement on the left bank of the Dravinja River in the Municipality of Videm in eastern Slovenia. Its territory extends northwards towards Barislovci up to the left bank of the Polskava River. The area traditionally belonged to the Styria region. It is now included in the Drava Statistical Region.

References

External links
Zgornja Pristava on Geopedia

Populated places in the Municipality of Videm